Nando Paone (born 27 November 1956) is an Italian actor. He appeared in more than thirty films since 1977.

Selected filmography

References

External links 

1956 births
Living people
Italian male film actors